Sandra Adams could refer to: 

Sandra E. Adams (born 1956), U.S. Navy admiral
Sandy Adams (born 1956), American politician